Sergio Javier Nápoles Saucedo (born 23 November 1989) is a Mexican footballer who plays as a winger for Walter Ferretti.

Club career

Atlante F.C.
He made his professional debut under coach Miguel Herrera with Atlante F.C. in the Clausura 2011 coming in at the second half against América at the Azteca Stadium.

Cruz Azul
Nápoles signed with Cruz Azul before the start of the Apertura 2013. Coach Luis Fernando Tena used him as a left-back before making him return to his original position as a left-winger.

Club Deportivo Guadalajara
On June 4, 2014, he officially signed with Guadalajara.

References

1989 births
Living people
People from Cancún
Footballers from Quintana Roo
Association football midfielders
Atlante F.C. footballers
Cruz Azul footballers
C.D. Guadalajara footballers
Deportivo Toluca F.C. players
Club Atlético Zacatepec players
Alebrijes de Oaxaca players
Venados F.C. players
Liga MX players
Ascenso MX players
Mexican footballers